Clarence Walker may refer to:

 Clarence Walker (boxer) (1898–1957), South African boxer
 Clarence Tex Walker (1946–2007), American musician
 Clarence R. Walker (1892–1959), member of the California legislature
 Foots Walker (Clarence Walker, born 1951), American basketball player
 Clarence E. Walker, professor of history at UC Davis
 Clarence J. Walker (1928–1989), American college basketball player